Amelon may refer to:

 Virginia State Route 130, signed as Amelon Expressway in Madison Heights, Virginia
 Virginia State Route 669, signed as Amelon Road in Madison Heights, Virginia